Palpa may refer to:

In Peru
Palpa, Aucallama, a town in Aucallama District, Huaral Province
Palpa, Peru, a town in Palpa District, and capital of Palpa Province
Palpa District, Peru, a district in Palpa Province
Palpa Province, a province in Ica Region

In Nepal
Palpa District, a district in Lumbini Province

Languages
 Palpa, a dialect of the Sino-Tibetan Western Magar language
Palpa language (Indo-Aryan), a purported language related to Nepali